Raoiella is a genus of mite belonging to the family Tenuipalpidae.

Species
 Raoiella indica Hirst, 1924, the red palm mite
 Raoiella australica Womersley, 1940
 Raoiella macfarlanei Pritchard & Baker, 1958
 Raoiella pandanae Mohanasundaram, 1989 (Tamil-Nadu)
 Raoiella phoenica Smith-Meyer, 1979 (Sudan)
 Raoiella shimapana Smith-Meyer, 1979 (Transvaal)

References

Joel Hallan's Biology Catalog: Tenuipalpidae

Trombidiformes genera